Ravioli (singular: raviolo) are a type of pasta comprising a filling enveloped in thin pasta dough. Usually served in broth or with a sauce, they originated as a traditional food in Italian cuisine. Ravioli are commonly square, though other forms are also used, including circular and semi-circular (mezzelune).

The word 'ravioli' means "little turnips" in Italian dialect, from the Italian  meaning turnips, from the Latin .

History
Ravioli appears in a French document from a church in 1228 where they are decribe as pieces of pasta containing minced meat and minced turnip in Lent. Rave means turnip in French and the word raviole can be understood as "little turnip".

The earliest known mention of ravioli appears in the personal letters of Francesco di Marco Datini, a merchant of Prato in the 14th century. In Venice, the mid-14th-century manuscript Libro per cuoco offers ravioli of green herbs blanched and minced, mixed with beaten egg and fresh cheese, simmered in broth and seasoned with "sweet and strong spices".  In Rome, ravioli were already well known when Bartolomeo Scappi served them with boiled chicken to the papal conclave of 1549.

Ravioli were already known in 14th-century England, appearing in the Anglo-Norman vellum manuscript The Forme of Cury under the name of rauioles. 
Sicilian ravioli and Malta's ravjul may thus be older than North Italian ones.

Overview

Traditionally, ravioli are made at home. The filling varies according to the area where they are prepared. In Rome and Latium the filling is made with ricotta cheese, spinach, nutmeg and black pepper. In Sardinia, ravioli are filled with ricotta and grated lemon rind.

Modern ravioli are also mass-produced by machine.

Around the world
In Europe and the United States, fresh-packed ravioli have several weeks of shelf life. Canned ravioli were pioneered by the Italian Army in the First World War and were popularized by Heinz and Buitoni in the UK and Europe, and Chef Boyardee in the United States. Canned ravioli may be filled with beef, processed cheese, chicken, or Italian sausage and served in a tomato, tomato-meat, or tomato-cheese sauce. Toasted ravioli (ravioli that have been breaded and deep fried) was developed in St. Louis, Missouri, and is a popular appetizer and snack food.

Ravioli are commonly encountered in the cooking of Nice, the broader Côte d'Azur, and the surrounding regions in the south of France. The contents of these vary greatly, but most idiosyncratic to the region is the use of leftover daube meat.  Miniaturized cheese-filled ravioli, locally called ravioles, are a specialty of the Drôme department in the Rhône-Alpes region, particularly the commune of Romans-sur-Isère, and are frequently served au gratin.

Ravioli filled with halloumi are a traditional pasta dish of Cypriot cuisine. They are boiled in chicken stock and served with grated halloumi and dried mint on top.

In other cultures
In Turkey, Mantı which is similar to ravioli is a popular dish. It is stuffed with spiced meat and served with paprika sauce and yoghurt. Similar dishes in China are the jiaozi or wonton.

In India, a popular dish called gujiya is similar to ravioli. However, it is prepared sweet, with a filling of dry fruits, sugar, and a mixture of sweet spices, then deep fried in vegetable oil. Different stuffings are used in different parts of India. The dish is a popular food prepared during festivals all over the country.

Jewish cuisine has a similar dish called kreplach, a pocket of meat or other filling, with an egg pasta based covering. It is simmered in chicken soup. In that method of preparation it appears to be the direct descendant or inspiration of the original dish, which was simmered in "broth".  Claudia Roden argues it originated in the Venetian Ghetto at about the same time ravioli was developed, and in time became a mainstay of Jewish cuisine.

A similar Middle Eastern dish called shishbarak contains pasta filled with minced beef meat and cooked in hot yogurt.

See also

Agnolotti
Baozi
Gnocchi
Italian cuisine
Khinkali
Kreplach
List of dumplings
List of Italian dishes
Mandu
Mantı
Mataz
Maultasche
Modak / Kozhakkattai
Momo (food)
Pelmeni
Pierogi
Samosa
Sorrentinos
Tortellini

References

Notes

Sources
 Adamson, Melitta Weiss; ed. (2002) Regional Cuisines of Medieval Europe: A Book of Essays. Routledge. .

External links

 How to make ravioli from scratch (video)
 General catalog of double sheet ravioli shapes
 Machine-made ravioli (video), commercial demonstration of machine producing different kinds of pasta, including ravioli

Pasta dishes
Dumplings
Italian cuisine
French cuisine
Maltese cuisine
Cypriot cuisine